History of the Ancient World is a 1981 historical book written by Russian writer Fyodor Korovkin. It was first published by Progress Publishers. Subsequently, it was translated in Bengali and English respectively in 1983 and 1985.

Synopsis
The book History of the Ancient World provides information on the history of the ancient states in Mesopotamia, Egypt, India, and China. It also includes the history of ancient Greece and Rome up to the fall of the Western Roman Empire in the 5th century AD. Its several chapters deal with religious views, art, and culture of the peoples of the ancient world.

References

External links 
 History of the Ancient World, text in PDF format

1981 non-fiction books
Russian non-fiction books
Books by Fyodor Korovkin
Progress Publishers books